Etiocholanedione, also known as 5β-androstanedione or as etiocholane-3,17-dione, is a naturally occurring etiocholane (5β-androstane) steroid and an endogenous metabolite of androgens like testosterone, dihydrotestosterone, dehydroepiandrosterone (DHEA), and androstenedione. It is the C5 epimer of androstanedione (5α-androstanedione). Although devoid of androgenic activity like other 5β-reduced steroids, etiocholanedione has some biological activity of its own. The compound has been found to possess potent haematopoietic effects in a variety of models. In addition, it has been found to promote weight loss in animals and in a double-blind, placebo-controlled clinical study in humans conducted in 1993. These effects are said to be similar to those of DHEA. Unlike DHEA however, etiocholanedione cannot be metabolized further into steroid hormones like androgens and estrogens.

References

External links
 Etiocholanedione (HMDB0003769) - Human Metabolome Database

Antiobesity drugs
Diketones
Etiocholanes
Steroid hormones